Bratislav Pejčić (born 17 January 1983) is a Serbian former footballer. He played in a midfielder position.

Career

Early career 
He started his career in FK Budućnost Banatski Dvor, who are now known as FK Banat Zrenjanin, with whom he spent about three and a half seasons. He then moved to FK Vlasina Vlasotince, who he played with for two and a half seasons, playing 100 times, and scoring six goals in the league. He also helped the new Second League members get to the Serbia and Montenegro Cup quarter-finals in 2004–05 season and to maintain their second tier (Second League of Serbia and Montenegro, later became Serbian First League) status in 2005, 2006 and 2007.

He then moved to Serbian League West, in a Serbian third tier outfit, FK Mladi Radnik Požarevac, and earned them a promotion to Serbian First League right away in the 2007–08 season. In the debut season in the Serbian First League in 2008–09, FK Mladi Radnik Požarevac achieved a third place and another consecutive promotion, this time to the highest rank, Serbian SuperLiga but it came out to be a short trip as they ended up in the last place in 2009–10 Serbian SuperLiga.

Meanwhile, in mid-season Pejčić joined FK Radnički Niš who also managed to get relegated, but from Serbian First League to Serbian League East. Pejčić managed to put in 14 appearances and scored one goal in that second half of the season, and even though Radnički Niš lost only one game in the spring under coach Aleksandar Ilić, they still got relegated due to the poor start in the first half of the season.

FK Radnički Niš

2010–11

Pejčić stayed a member and a friend of a wounded lion FK Radnički Niš, who has touched the lowest spots in its history for the second time in just couple of seasons, as they had to compete in 2010–11 Serbian League East again. Nevertheless, FK Radnički Niš walked over the third tier opponents easily and got ready to forget and never to have to remember the third Serbian tier.

2011–12

And as fast as they got through the Serbian League East, next season proved to be even better. 2011–12 Serbian First League got conquered, even with three coaching changes, the last one happened to be Aleksandar Ilić again, and even though the financial troubles started to mount within the club, not for once did the FK Radnički Niš players let someone take over the first spot. Pejčić put in another great season, this time appearing 20 times and scoring three goals.
After nine long seasons, southern Serbian giant has come back, and Pejčić's loyalty did not get forgotten.

2012–13

Indeed, as expected, manager Aleksandar Ilić made numerous changes in the squad, as he finally had an opportunity to create the team himself, and not improvise with a sinking ship like he did before. Only select few got the opportunity to stay, as the manager made up a completely new team for the comeback 2012–13 Serbian SuperLiga season.

Pejčić was named captain of FK Radnički Niš. In the 2012-13 season, Pejčić made 26 appearances in the league, scoring 2 goals. He also played the entire 90 minutes of the 1/16 Serbian Cup clash with the Belgrade giants Red Star.

2013-14 
Pejčić made just 4 league appearances for FK Radnički Niš during the 2013-14 season, scoring 0 goals.

FK Radnik Surdulica 
Pejčić signed for Surdulica in 2014. In 5 years at the club, he has made over 100 appearances, scoring 1 goal in the league.

Honours
Radnik Surdulica
Serbian First League: 2014–15
 Serbian First League
 Winner (1): 2012
 3rd Place (1): 2009
 Serbian League West
Winner (1): 2008
 Serbian League East
Winner (1): 2011

References

External links
 Bratislav Pejčić at SrbijaFudbal.net

Serbian footballers
FK Radnički Niš players
FK Budućnost Banatski Dvor players
FK Vlasina players
FK Mladi Radnik players
FK Radnik Surdulica players
Serbian First League players
Serbian SuperLiga players
1983 births
Living people
Association football midfielders